Muhammad Adi Satryo (born 7 July 2001) is an Indonesian professional footballer who plays as a goalkeeper for Liga 1 club PSIS Semarang and the Indonesia national team.

Club career

PSS Sleman
Adi Satryo joined PSS Sleman from Liga 2 club PSMS Medan in March 2021 ahead of the 2021 Menpora Cup, in which he started in one match when starting goalkeeper Ega Rizky was off-duty.

Persik Kediri
In 2022, Satryo signed a contract with Indonesian Liga 1 club Persik Kediri.  He made his league debut on 8 January 2022 in a match against Borneo at the Kapten I Wayan Dipta Stadium, Gianyar. In the 85th minute, Satryo had a terrible incident towards the end of the match, he was unconscious after being involved in an incident
with Borneo's Kei Hirose in the continuation of the Liga 1 match and he could not continue the match and had to be hospitalized after previously collapsing from a hard kick and hitting his neck during a one-on-one duel. And a few days later, Satryo recovered quickly and
not seriously injured.

PSIS Semarang
Adi Satryo became PSIS Semarang's first recruit in half of the 2022–23 Liga 1. Adi Satryo was recruited by Laskar Mahesa Jenar to add depth to the squad in the goalkeeper position. Satryo made his professional debut on 16 January 2023 in a match against RANS Nusantara at the Pakansari Stadium, Bogor.

International career
Adi Satryo never played in an official match of the Indonesia national under-19 football team but was the starting goalkeeper for the U-19 team when they went on a two-month training session in Croatia where they played against other national youth squads. He debuted in a 9 August 2020 friendly match against Croatia U-19, in which Indonesia lost 1-7. 

Despite Satryo's lack of experience in top-flight football or official international youth championships, Indonesia national football team coach Shin Tae-yong in May 2021 called him to join the senior team. He earned his first senior cap in a 25 May 2021 friendly match in Dubai against Afghanistan.

In February 2022, Satryo was called up to play for the Indonesia under-23 team for the 2022 AFF U-23 Youth Championship.

Career statistics

Club

Notes

International

Honours

Club 
 PSS Sleman
 Menpora Cup third place: 2021

International 
 Indonesia U-19
 AFF U-19 Youth Championship third place: 2019

Indonesia U-23
 Southeast Asian Games  Bronze medal: 2021

References

External links
 

2001 births
Living people
Indonesian footballers
PSMS Medan players
PSS Sleman players
Persik Kediri players
Liga 1 (Indonesia) players
Indonesia youth international footballers
Indonesia international footballers
People from Tangerang
Sportspeople from Banten
Association football goalkeepers
Competitors at the 2021 Southeast Asian Games
Southeast Asian Games bronze medalists for Indonesia
Southeast Asian Games medalists in football